The Warrior's Husband is a 1933 American pre-Code comedy film directed by Walter Lang and starring Elissa Landi, David Manners, and Ernest Truex. It tells the story of the Amazons, who ruled over men thanks to the sacred girdle of Diana, and Hercules who came to steal it. The film is based on a 1932 Broadway production of Julian Thompson's 1924 play that starred Katharine Hepburn in the lead role.

Production of Broadway play
The Broadway play of the year before is considered one of the breakthrough roles of Katharine Hepburn. It was a revival of a 1924 play by Julian F. Thompson (the play would re-appear in 1942 as By Jupiter). The film version was made with an entirely different cast and music.

Plot
In Pontus, the land of the Amazons, the gender roles and natures are completely reversed. Women are the strong sex, thanks to the sacred girdle of the goddess Diana (Roman names are used). It is in the care of queen Hippolyta and her sister Antiope (in the 1932 production played by Katharine Hepburn), the commander of the female armed forces. The men stay at home and take care of the children. Only Sapiens, the new husband of queen Hippolyta, advocates men's rights.

Just like the relationships are reversed, so too are the Greeks for the Amazons a legendary race that probably doesn't exist, instead of the other way around. This is about to change when two Greeks come to court to announce that Hercules needs to get the girdle of Diana to complete his twelve labours. In reality, Hercules may not be much of a threat, but his friend Theseus certainly is. Meanwhile, Sapiens, using his male wiles, is secretly trying to wreck the Amazon's defense from within. Eventually he manages to capture Hercules, and let him escape with the girdle. Without it, the Amazons lose the battle and the gender dynamic shifts to roles matching the social mores of the 1930s.

Main cast
Elissa Landi as Antiope 
David Manners as Theseus 
Ernest Truex as Sapiens
Marjorie Rambeau as Hippolyta
Tiny Sandford as Hercules
Helen Ware as Pomposia
Lionel Belmore as Homer
Maude Eburne as Buria

Preservation status
The film has not been issued on home video or shown on television, although George Eastman House and the Museum of Modern Art have copies.

See also
 List of films featuring Hercules

References

External links

1933 films
1933 comedy films
American black-and-white films
Films with screenplays by Sonya Levien
Films directed by Walter Lang
American comedy films
Fox Film films
1930s English-language films
1930s American films